George Curcă (born 8 May 1981) is a Romanian former professional football player who played as a goalkeeper. He started his career at Farul Constanța, club for which he played in over 250 matches, being one of the most important players of the 2000s for "the Sailors". Curcă also played for Dinamo București and Unirea Urziceni, before moving to England in 2015 where played for a short period at amateur club from Corby.

References

External links
 
 

1981 births
Living people
People from Isaccea
Romanian footballers
Romania under-21 international footballers
Association football goalkeepers
Liga I players
Liga II players
FCV Farul Constanța players
FC Dinamo București players
FC Unirea Urziceni players
Romanian expatriate footballers
Romanian expatriate sportspeople in England
Expatriate footballers in England